1155 Aënna, provisional designation , is an asteroid from the inner regions of the asteroid belt, approximately 11 kilometers in diameter. It was discovered on 26 January 1928, by German astronomer Karl Reinmuth at Heidelberg Observatory in southwest Germany. It is named for the astronomy journal Astronomische Nachrichten.

Orbit and classification 

In the SMASS taxonomy, the X-type asteroid is classified as a Xe-type, an intermediary that transitions to the bright E-type asteroids. The spectra of a Xe-type contains an absorption feature near 0.49 μm, which is thought to be related with the presence of the iron sulfide mineral troilite, typically found in lunar and Martian meteorites. Aënna orbits the Sun in the inner main-belt at a distance of 2.1–2.9 AU once every 3 years and 10 months (1,413 days). Its orbit has an eccentricity of 0.16 and an inclination of 7° with respect to the ecliptic. The body's observation arc begins at Heidelberg with its official discovery observation in 1928.

Physical characteristics

Rotation period 

French amateur astronomer René Roy obtained a rotational lightcurve of Aënna from photometric observations taken in December 2015. Lightcurve analysis gave a rotation period of 8.07 hours with a brightness variation of 0.28 magnitude.

Diameter and albedo 

According to the surveys carried out by the Japanese Akari satellite and NASA's Wide-field Infrared Survey Explorer with its subsequent NEOWISE mission, Aënna measures between 9.28 and 14.09 kilometers in diameter, and its surface has an albedo between 0.225 and 0.356. The Collaborative Asteroid Lightcurve Link agrees best with Akari, and derives an albedo of 0.2169 with a diameter of 11.36 kilometers and an absolute magnitude of 12.0.

Naming 

This minor planet was named after Astronomische Nachrichten, one of the first international journals in the field of astronomy. The constructed name "Aënna" contains the German pronunciation of the initials "A" and "N" followed by the mandatory feminine ending used for asteroids. The naming was proposed by the Astronomisches Rechen-Institut and mentioned in The Names of the Minor Planets by Paul Herget in 1955.

References

External links 
 Asteroid Lightcurve Database (LCDB), query form (info )
 Dictionary of Minor Planet Names, Google books
 Asteroids and comets rotation curves, CdR – Observatoire de Genève, Raoul Behrend
 Discovery Circumstances: Numbered Minor Planets (1)-(5000) – Minor Planet Center
 
 

001155
Discoveries by Karl Wilhelm Reinmuth
Named minor planets
001155
19280126